Bolli Þorleiksson (also Bolli Thorleiksson;;) was a key historical character in the Medieval Icelandic Laxdœla saga, which recounts the history of the People of Laxárdalur. He courted the famed Guðrún Ósvífursdóttir. Although Guðrún preferred his foster-brother Kjartan Ólafsson, she gave herself to Bolli  because of a false rumour that Kjartan was engaged to  Ingibjörg Tryggvadóttir, the sister of King Ólafur Tryggvason. Bolli engaged in hostilities with his foster-brother, which ended with him killing Kjartan, and then being killed in turn by Kjartan's kinsmen at the dairy.

Death and aftermath
Bolli was well known for his skill and his swordsmanship. Prior to the attack, Thorstein the Black said "however underhanded he may be where he is, you may make up your mind for a brisk defence on his part, strong and skilled at arms as he is. He also has a sword that for a weapon is a trusty one." Bolli dealt one of his attackers a blow, which clove him through the head to the shoulder, killing him.

His second son, Bolli Bollasson, was born the winter after his killing, and his first son Thorleik was only four at the time. They grew up in Holyfell, after his mother Guðrún exchanged homes with the renowned Snorri the Goði. Guðrún constantly argued for revenge for his killing, but eventually his two sons made peace with the sons of Ólaf, Kjartan's kinsmen, at the Thorness Thing; it is not known how much money was exchanged in compensation as part of the agreement, but "both sides were thought to have gained in esteem from these affairs".

Footnotes

External links
Full text and several English translations in the Icelandic Saga Database
Translation in English by Muriel Press (The Temple Classics, London, 1899)
Text with modern Icelandic spelling
Laxdæla saga in an English translation by Muriel A. C. Press, 1899, from Project Gutenberg
Genealogy
Byzantine & Varangian Equipment

Sagas of Icelanders
10th-century Icelandic people